Sebastien Gael Adam (born March 28, 1986 in Beau Bassin) is a Mauritian swimmer who specializes in freestyle events. He represented his nation Mauritius at the 2008 Summer Olympics, placing himself among the top 60 swimmers in the 100 m freestyle. During his sporting career, Adam trained full-time at Brest Swimming Club in France.

Adam was invited by FINA to compete for Mauritius in the men's 100 m freestyle at the 2008 Summer Olympics in Beijing. Swimming in heat two, he chased Fiji's five-time Olympian Carl Probert on the final stretch to hit the wall in third place and fifty-seventh overall by a close, 0.02-second margin with a time of 52.35 seconds.

References

External links
 
NBC Olympics Profile

1986 births
Living people
Mauritian male freestyle swimmers
Olympic swimmers of Mauritius
Swimmers at the 2008 Summer Olympics
Commonwealth Games competitors for Mauritius
Swimmers at the 2006 Commonwealth Games